Love Fantastic is the sixth studio album released by Ai Otsuka on 16 July 2014. It was her first album released in 6 years, as the previous one—Love Letter—was released in 2008.

The album reached #22 on the weekly Oricon chart, and it continued to rank for a total of five weeks. Love Fantastic is Otsuka's first studio record to chart outside of Oricon's Top 20. It was also her first album to not receive a certification.

Track listing
Trakclist from Ai's official website.

References

Ai Otsuka albums
Avex Group albums